Lammermuir, named for the Lammermuir Hills, was a tea clipper designed by William Pile. She was the first clipper owned by Jock Willis Shipping Line. She was a fast sailer, being the second ship home in the 1858-59 tea season. She was a favourite of John Willis senior.

Building
Michael Byers & Co built Lammermuir at his Strand Street shipyard in Monkwearmouth, launching her on 8 January 1856 and completing her on 20 February. She had a wooden hull. She had three masts. She did not set any sails above royals, but she did have a great spread of sail.

John Willis registered the ship at London. Her UK official number was 13717.

Loss
Lammermuir was wrecked on the Amherst Reef in the Macclesfield Channel, Gaspar Strait, on 31 December 1863.

Jock "White Hat" Willis commissioned a replacement , which was launched in 1864 and completed in 1865. The wreck of the first Lammermuir was still visible above the water line in August 1866 when the second Lammermuir sailed past en route to China, and also subsequently in 1874.

References

Bibliography
Broomhall, Alfred James, 1983, Hudson Taylor and China's Open Century, Volume Four: Survivors' Pact, London, Hodder & Stoughton and Overseas Missionary Fellowship

External links

Individual sailing vessels
Tea clippers
1856 ships
Age of Sail merchant ships of England
Ships built on the River Wear
Shipwrecks of Indonesia
Maritime incidents in 1863